Zuojin Wan   is a yellowish-brown pill used in Traditional Chinese medicine to "quench liver-fire, regulate the stomach function and relieve pain". Indications include an "attack of the stomach by liver-fire marked by epigastric and hypochondriac pain, bitterness in the mouth, heartburn and acid regurgitation, and a dislike for hot drinks".

Chinese classic herbal formula

See also
 Chinese classic herbal formula
 Bu Zhong Yi Qi Wan

References

External links

Traditional Chinese medicine pills